The St. Louis Blues are a professional ice hockey team based in St. Louis, Missouri.

St. Louis Blues or Saint Louis Blues may also refer to:
 "Saint Louis Blues" (song), a blues tune and song by W. C. Handy, published in 1914
 Saint Louis Blues F.C., an Australian rules football team in the United States Australian Football League
 St. Louis Blues (1929 film), a two-reel short directed by Dudley Murphy
 St. Louis Blues (1939 film), a film directed by Raoul Walsh
 St. Louis Blues (1958 film), a feature film
 Saint Louis Blues (2009 film), 2009 French film
 St. Louis Blues (album), a 1958 album by Nat King Cole
 St. Louis blues (music), a type of blues music
 St. Louis Blues, a defunct American football team that played the 1934 season in the American Football League (1934)
 St. Louis Jr. Blues, a Junior A ice hockey team in Affton, Missouri